Ross Winans (1796–1877) was an American inventor, mechanic, and builder of locomotives and railroad machinery. He is also noted for design of pioneering cigar-hulled ships. Winans, one of the United States' first multi-millionaires, was involved in national and state politics, a southern-sympathizer and was a vehement "states' rights" advocate. Winans was briefly arrested after the Baltimore riot of 1861. His outspoken anti-federal stance as a member of the Maryland House of Delegates, the lower chamber of the General Assembly, (state legislature) led to his temporary arrest on May 14, 1861.  At the time of his arrest, Winans was returning on a Baltimore and Ohio Railroad train from an early session of the legislature that was being held in the western Maryland town of Frederick to avoid the Union Army-occupied state capital of Annapolis in April–May 1861 to consider the possibilities of state secession during the early decisive period of the American Civil War. Winans was related to James McNeill Whistler through marriage (Whistler's brother George married Winans' daughter Julia).

Early life
Ross Winans was born in Vernon Township, New Jersey on October 17, 1796. His parents were William and Mary Winans. He married Julia de Kay (1800-1850) in 1820 and they had five children. He moved his family to Baltimore, Maryland in the late 1820s and did business with the newly founded Baltimore and Ohio Railroad (B. & O.).

Following the death of his wife Julia in 1850, he married Elizabeth K. West (1807-1889) in 1854.

Railroad Work

Winans came from a New Jersey family of horse breeders, but successfully made the transition to other forms of motive power.

In 1828 he developed a friction wheel with outside bearings which established a distinctive pattern for railroad wheels for the next one hundred years or so. In the late 1820s also he became associated with the B&O, eventually entering their service as an engineer. One of his first and more important tasks was to help the famous inventor and industrialist Peter Cooper, (1791-1883), of New York City build the new revolutionary "Tom Thumb" steam-powered locomotive, to eventually replace the horse-drawn rail cars then being pulled along the short route of the Baltimore and Ohio that had been built so far - from the city's waterfront temporary depot facing "The Basin" (today's "Inner Harbor") at East Pratt Street and South Charles Streets to the southwest 20-some miles to its first terminus at Ellicott Mills on the upper Western Branch of the Patapsco River. By 1831, he was appointed assistant engineer of machinery on the B. & O. He invented and patented an improvement in the construction of axles, or bearings on July 20, 1831. Also in this productive year he built the "Columbus", his first double-truck car, which he immediately patented, even though it is widely known he stole the idea for after the original inventor failed to do so.

In 1835, Winans went into partnership with George Gillingham and in 1836 they succeeded to the 1834 lease of Phineas Davis and Israel Gardner of the B. & O. Company's shops at Mount Clare and continued the manufacture of locomotives and railroad machinery. "As far back perhaps as the year 1836, the firm of Gillingham and Winans, and, after the dissolution of that firm, I myself, down to 1841 or 1842, manufactured a Rail Road Wheel..." (letter #322).

In 1841, he opened his own shop adjacent to the B. & O.'s new Mount Clare Shops, along West Pratt Street, between Arlington and Schroeder Streets in southwest Baltimore, with that railroad as his primary customer. He was a pioneer in the development of substituting coal-burning steam locomotives, for the less efficient wood-burners. He was eccentric, and his locomotive business made him independently wealthy. His customer relations were simple—he built engines his way, and you bought them. Bored with the business, and having a design disagreement with the B. & O., he closed his shops, which were later leased to the Hayward, Bartlett, and Co. iron and steel foundries. He went on to do significant work for the Czar's railroad from the new imperial capital St. Petersburg on the Baltic Sea to the old traditional medieval capital of Moscow in central Russia. All of the listed engines are type 0-8-0, called the "Camel." They were all acquired from predecessor roads. Engine sales to the Cumberland and Pennsylvania Railroad (C. & P.) were recorded in 1863. James Millholland, the C. & P. Master Mechanic, was familiar with keeping these "Camel" engines running, and making improvements to them.

Winans set trends in locomotive and car design rather than followed them. His steam locomotives, popularly known as "Crabs," "Muddiggers," and "Camels" were used all over the fledgling rail network of the burgeoning industrial northeastern United States, from the 1840s until after the turn of the 20th century. The B. & O. was Winans' largest locomotive customer, with one hundred and forty locomotive deliveries going to that road. Winans had a disagreement with Mr. Hayes of the B. & O., which delayed delivery of some engines into 1863. Winans' second best customer was the Philadelphia and Reading Railroad. These two customers represented 70 percent of his sales. Winans typically offered a thirty-day trial period at the customer site.

About three hundred engine deliveries to twenty-six American railroads by Winans are documented during the period 1843–1863. He is also credited with being the first manufacture to export a locomotive to Europe. The Winans engine designs impressed a Russian delegation, and he was asked by the Czar to build the Imperial railroad from Moscow to St. Petersburg. Winans sent his two sons, as well as engineer George W. Whistler (father of painter James Whistler) to Russia for several years for that project. Winans may have sold as much or more equipment in Russia as he did in the United States, with both future 20th Century "super-powers" now setting the stage by building up their industrial and transportation networks on a continental scale, unknown in the smaller countries and kingdoms of Europe. Winans' son Thomas returned to build a Russian style estate in west Baltimore, named "Alexandrofsky", surrounded by a somewhat forbidding-looking wall which also enclosed an eclectic sculpture garden. Further west, another country estate of Italianate design with fieldstone walls in future suburban Baltimore County overlooking along the Gwynns Falls stream valley named "Crimea", off the Franklintown Road. "Alexandrofsky", located near what is now the Hollins Market, built in the 1830s, was demolished a century later to expand the housing stock of the city and fill in the regular street grid of white marble-stepped brick rowhouses. "Crimea" was later sold to the city, using a substantial money bequest from Mr Leakin in the 1920s to be set aside for purchasing a large parcel of property for a future park somewhere in the city. The Crimea purchase and park development was added to the Gwynn's Falls Park with the added name of Leakin Park. The contents of the "Crimea" mansion  were sold at auction. Luckily, twenty-three boxes of Winans papers and journals were donated to the Maryland Historical Society in the old Enoch Pratt mansion on Park Avenue and West Monument Street in Mount Vernon-Belvedere neighborhood for safekeeping. The new municipal park was designated and designed as a "wilderness forest reserve" to preserve the natural foresting along the stream valleys Gwynns Falls-Leakin still maintains the original fieldstone mansion, with extensive porches and balconies, with a variety of interior uses. Surrounding the estate is the remnants of an intriquing cannon embankment with slotted places for carved logs resembling iron artillery pieces, supposedly Winans' attempt to deter Northern troops from camping on his grounds, a testimony to his infamous pro-Southern sympathies. Also a water wheel apparatus still exists along the stream for drawing fresh water uphill along with a small family cemetery now wooded in by the forest. The Carrie Murray Nature Center was recently established here in the early 1980s in remembrance of the mother of a famous Baltimore Orioles baseball team player Eddie Murray of the time, who donated it, to educate and enlighten visiting school children from the Baltimore City Public Schools. A clap-board Gothic stylish small chapel also exists on the grounds along the entrance road, Eagle Driveway from West Forest Park Avenue.

Winans' next important development in steam locomotive design was an 8-wheel connected freight locomotive in the early 1840s. In 1843, Gillingham and Winans built their own shop to maximize their profits. The company's most notable product was the "camelback locomotive". Winans quit the locomotive business in 1857 after a dispute with Henry Tyson, then head of motive power for the B. & O., over the use of leading bogies (trucks) on his locomotives. Winans generated a great many patents and was heavily engaged in litigation (legal lawsuits) over ideas he claimed as his own.

The majority of the Winans engines were burden (freight) as opposed to passenger type. Engines delivered after June 1848 are almost all of the Camel 0-8-0 type, favored by Winans. The early models are sometimes referred to as the "Baltimore engines". The "Camel" name derives from the first of class of that name, delivered to the B. & O.  in 1848. All "Camel" engines were of the 0-8-0 wheel arrangement. Winans did not believe in the use of leading (pony) trucks.

The "Camel" engines were all low-speed, heavy haul units. The speed was limited to 10–15 miles per hour by the steam capacity of the boiler, and the lack of a pilot truck. However, at that speed, a single "Camel" could haul a 110 car train of loaded coal hoppers on the level. The most distinctive feature of the "Camel" was the cab atop the boiler. They had a large steam dome, slide valves, and used staybolts in the boiler.

There were three major variations: the short, medium, and long furnace models. The small units had 17" × 22" cylinders, and the others had 19" × 22" cylinders. The fireman worked in the tender, as the firebox was behind the drivers. This design required that the drawbar passed beneath the firebox, and it typically heated to a cherry red color. Even after rebuilds with a more conventional cab design, the fireman worked in the tender. The standard Camel engine had 43" wheels, and was painted green.

"Camel" tenders were 8-wheeled, generally with brakes on the rear truck only. They held 5 tons of coal, and 8 tons (more than 2000 gallons) of water. Fully loaded, the tenders weighted 23 tons, only 4 tons less than the locomotive.

Ten "Camels" were delivered to the Baltimore and Susquehanna Railroad, which was running its lines from the north near Harrisburg, Pennsylvania  including one "engine sold them from Maryland Mining Co., $8000 cash." Ten more sales were also recorded to the B. & S.'s successor line, the Northern Central Railway. Two units went to the Elmira & Canandaguia Railroad in New York, and were subsequently sold to the Cumberland & Pennsylvania. The P. & R. engine "Susquehanna" is described in detail in rail historian White's book (ref. 71). Two Winans engines went to the Huntingdon & Broad Top Mountain (H. & B.T.M.) Railroad in southwestern Pennsylvania in 1863. One unit blew up in 1868, with the loss of four lives. The H. & B.T.M. ran along the west side of Broad Top Mountain, best known for the narrow gauge line on its east side, the East Broad Top Railroad. The C. & P. interchanged with the H. & B.T.M. at State Line, Pennsylvania.

Most of the Winans "Camel" engines sold for around $10,000. Engine sales were expedited by syndicates of what we would now call investment bankers, such as Mr. Enoch Pratt. Banks did not yet have the accumulated capital to make loans for commercial purposes.

The records of the Philadelphia & Reading contain detailed information on "Camel" engine mileage's and rebuildings. This line received a series of forty-eight deliveries from 1846 to 1855. By 1858, the P. & R. had racked up in excess of 3.5 million miles on its 44 engines, with the "Camel" fleet representing 20 percent of the P. & R. motive power roster. By the end of the Civil War period in 1865, 28 of its 48 engines had not yet been rebuilt. By 1870, only 4 of the 48 were not yet rebuilt, but these four had accumulated almost one million miles of road service. The average service life before a rebuild was about thirteen and one-half years. Similar data for the B. & O. gives an average service life of 8.5 years before rebuilding. A total of 15 "Camel" rebuilds are recorded at the C. & P. shops in Mount Savage, Pennsylvania from 1866 through 1875.

There are only three documented catastrophic failures in "Camel" engines. Non-catastrophic failures were more prevalent, but fewer were documented. Railroad historian/author Roberts (reference 48) gives the performance of a Winans "Camel" on the B. & O.’s  grade, circa 1855, as 144 trailing tons. Engine 71 was a Winans "Camel", built in April 1851. The Winans engine could haul 40 empty coal hoppers up the Eckhart Branch, based on a tare weight of 3 tons for the Winans-designed 6-wheel hoppers in use in 1854.

Civil War politics

During the Civil War Winans was elected a member of the Maryland House of Delegates (the lower house of the state legislature) for the 1861 special sessions called to discuss the issue of secession, and was arrested twice due to his anti-Federal activities and speeches. On the day before the Baltimore riot of 1861, Winans moved a resolution "protest[ing] in the name of the people of Maryland against the garrisoning of Southern forts by militia drawn from the free States" and 'calling upon citizens of the state unite "to repel, if need be, any invader who may come to establish a military despotism over us." He was arrested shortly after the riot, was released, and elected again on April 24 as part of a States Rights ticket.  Meanwhile, Winans' firm was reportedly preparing weapons and munitions for the defense of Baltimore against union troops. According to the American of April 23, "At the works of the Mssrs. Winans, the entire force is engaged in the making of pikes, and in casting balls of very description..."  (Brown, 65). On May 14, one day after martial law was declared in Baltimore, Winans was again arrested while returning from  a special session of the Maryland legislature in Frederick (the session in which the Maryland legislature considered, but ultimately rejected, secession). He was quickly released, after signing a  "parole" guaranteeing his loyalty to the federal government.  Winans' arrest, by Benjamin Butler's Federal troops, was one of the cases where Lincoln's emergency suspension of habeas corpus was employed. Winans' brief incarceration was not legally challenged, as it was in the case of Johns Merryman (Ex parte Merryman).

While Winans is often credited as the inventor of the Winans Steam Gun, said to be among the weapons bought from the five hundred thousand dollar fund that Baltimore Mayor Brown and Maryland Governor Hicks gathered "for the defense of the city. This experimental weapon was in fact not designed by Winans, but was invented by Charles S. Dickinson, and built in Boston in 1860. It passed through Winan's machine shop during the period when his workers were making pikes, shot and other items ordered by city authorities. When it emerged, its former history was forgotten, and word spread that it was built by Winan's to oppose Federal troops. Though this novelty ultimately had no military impact, it was widely discussed at the time and its connection to Winans, along with his political views reputation as a threat to federal control of Maryland.

The Russian Connection, and the Czar's St. Petersburg Railroad
Railroad construction began to be of interest in Russia in the 1830s. Two colonels were sent to the United States as a Russian Railroad Mission to assess the State of the Art. The Tsar was interested in a new passenger locomotive on the Reading, a design of Moncure Robinson. The Colonels reported back favorably on American Railroad practice, and recommended Major George Washington Whistler as consultant for the project. Various gauges were in use on American lines. Whistler went to St. Petersburg in 1842. He recommended a 5-foot gauge. Whistler got things going, but he died of Cholera in 1849. T. S. Brown, an American, was his replacement. Whistler's son (the painter) and his wife (the subject of the famous painting) went to England. Another son, George, stayed until his death in 1869. Whistler recommended that Winans take charge of the mechanical works at St. Petersburg.

The Russian Colonels also wanted Joseph Harrison, of Eastwick & Harrison of Philadelphia to construct the rolling stock, under a contract for three million dollars. The company had built a locomotive in 1839, the Gowan and Marx, an 11-ton 4-4-0 unit for the Philadelphia and Reading. this locomotive had several technological innovations, which impressed the Russians. The boiler was set over the driving wheels, resulting in excellent traction. Also, Eastwick and Harrison of Philadelphia introduced the equalizing lever, a spring suspension that distributed the engine's weight over three points. In this arrangement, each of the four driving wheels could bounce independently as the engine negotiated rough track, greatly improving stability and traction. Later add-ons to the Russian contract, included another two million dollars, partially for  the cast-iron bridge over the Neva River, the first time the river had been bridged.

Much of the machinery for the railroad, and the equipment came from the United States. Winans brought a "large and powerful locomotive" as well as "three steam pile driving machines." Four Otis steam shovels were imported from the U. S. By the order of the Czar, equipment was brought in duty-free. The firm Harrison, Winans, and Eastwick was organized in Russia for the venture.

Winans had impressed the Russians with his rail wagons, and he was invited to go to Russia and set up a factory. He declined, but sent his sons Thomas and William. Harrison sent a large portion of his Philadelphia manufacturing machinery to Russia, and installed it at the Alexandrovsky Works at St. Petersburg. This factory produced locomotives and rolling stock. It had a 5-year contract to develop locomotives and rolling stock. They impressed the Czar by finishing a year early, and secured a new contract. They eventually got a third extension, but were subsequently bought out by a Russian government entity, formed to operate the facility and the railroad. 
Thomas Winans followed in his father's footsteps, and was on a trip to deliver locomotives to the Boston and Albany, when he met George W. Whistler. Whistler was impressed by the young man. This meeting lead to the very lucrative Russian Contracts.

The Moscow to St. Petersburg Railway by built under the direction of Czar Nicholas I to connect his summer palace and his winter palace. There was a concern that the railway would enable social upheaval if the serfs were allowed to travel, so the service was restricted to the affluent and the aristocracy. The serfs were used to do the heavy labor, with a reported large loss of life. This is documented in the poem, The Railway, by Nikolay Nekrasov. After 10 years of construction, the line opened in November 1851.

George Washington Whistler was involved with the Czar on the rail project, as a consulting engineer. Winans was related to James McNeill Whistler through marriage (Whistler's brother George married Winans' daughter Julia)  Another participant was John Hazelhurst Latrobe, son of the B&O's Benjamin Latrobe. He served as legal council for Winans, because he spoke Russian.

The Winans Brothers and Harrison bought out the interests of Eastwick, and formed a company for operations and future railroad construction.

Winans and Eastwick also seemed to get involved in the manufacturing of gunpowder in Russia. This was eyed by American gunpowder manufacturer DuPont with some suspicion.. The Crimean War had broken out in 1854. The U. S. Department of State was consulted, and Winans was assured that U. S. interests were not involved.

William Winans served for a while as U. S. vice-consul to Russia at St. Petersburg, but resigned to continue his private business. The great St. Petersburg fire in May 1862 was partially contained by a steam pump from the Winans factory.

A financial crisis in 1865–66 lead to the Russian Finance Minister initiating a special Railroad Fund to ensure continuity of operations. One key point was the privatization of the railroad. The Winans' contract with the government was highly profitable for William Winans, but was draining the Imperial coffers. The Czar raised some money by selling Russian America (Alaska) to the Americans, and decided the privatization of the railroad would proceed. It was to go to the recently formed Grand Society of Russian Railroads. Winans was seen as "the robber of the Russian Treasury." Russian America was sold for nine million rubles, and Winans received six and a half million.

William Winans retired to England with an estimated 25 million rubles ($18–29 million). He wisely used some of this to buy shares in the new railroad venture in Russia, and became an influential, but not controlling, stockholder. 
The St. Petersburg to Moscow remains in daily operation at this writing.

References from the Journal of the Railroad and Locomotive Historical Society:

The Cigar Ship (or Boat)

In the mid-19th Century, Winans and his son Thomas designed and built a series of spindle-shaped boats, usually referred to as the "cigar ships" or "cigar boats".  The first was constructed in 1858 and featured an unprecedented (and in the end, technically unfeasible) midship propeller, enclosed in a shroud. This propeller was driven by steam engines located in each hull section. The intent was to allow the ship to progress with less disturbance from weather and waves. This ship was discussed at length in the pages of the "Scientific American" national journal/magazine, and in the end remained tied up at the Winans docks at Ferry Bar, southside of the Whetstone Point peninsula and along the north shore of the Middle Branch or Ferry Branch of the Patapsco River, just west of old Fort Covington and Fort Babcock which supported Fort McHenry in the September 1814 Battle of Baltimore during the War of 1812 for many years, (later the site of the Port Covington railroad and harbor piers of the Western Maryland Railway built in the late 1890s and early 1900s) after a series of trials and modifications. It was never subjected to a sea trial.
In his own words, "the length of the vessel was more than eleven times it breadth of beam, being 16 feet wide by 108 feet long." It included four high pressure steam engines, driving a large iron wheel with fins amidships. It did achieve a speed of 12 miles per hour on its trial in January 1859. He then lengthened the ship to 194, and then 235 feet. It went to England for further trials, but was never a great success.
After the Civil War, Winans and his son took their enterprise to Europe, and several similarly designed boats were built in England and in St. Petersburg, Russia. None of these were also put to full sea trials, though press reports survive of trips in the Solent and the English Channel. The boats themselves remained tied up in Southampton into the 1880s, but inspired no imitators.
The Russian Naval Journal reported on the ships in 1858. Winans shifted his interests outside of the United States during the Civil War.  His son William had gained experience in naval construction during the Crimean War, outfitting gunboats for the defense of St. Petersburg. The Railroad Shops at Alexandrovsky were employed for the Naval work.
Winans presented a proposal to the Russian Government entitled, "War Vehicles on the Spindle Principle," July 1861. This was favorably received by the Grand Duke Nuikolaevich, Chief of the Russian Navy. A Winans Cigar boat was tested on the Neva River, and ran to Kronstadt, where it conducted tests in the Gulf of Finland. The Russian Shipbuilding Technical Committee were not impressed..
Winans then proposed to the U. S. Government the design of his ships, in what he saw as a pending conflict with England. Nothing came of this. 
Winans took his cigar boat construction to England with his experimental Russian craft loaded on the British steamboat Nautilus. He built another cigar ship in Havre, France. He constructed a private yacht for himself in England, the fourth cigar ship. It was launched in 1866 on the Thames. Winans wanted to register his yacht at the Imperial Saint Petersburg Yacht Club. Numerous problems preventing the ship making the voyage.

Thomas Winans stayed for a time in Russia and contracted with the Czar's government to develop Russian railroads.

Other Interests
Winans took an interest in sanitary engineering and public health, publishing a number of pamphlets on sanitation, particularly in regard to water and ventilation.  He lobbied for the development of a public water supply for Baltimore City.

Winans was a pioneer in the development of low income housing building a housing project he called "workingmen's housing" in Baltimore. Today a public housing project remains on the site and is named Mount Winans.

He also published religious writings, including a pamphlet on religious tolerance and a collection of Unitarian sermons.

The Winans' cigar ship and its shape inspired Captain Nemo's submarine ship, in Twenty Thousand Leagues Under the Sea by Jules Verne.

Death
Winans died in Baltimore on April 11, 1877 at the age of 81.

Sources

 Bell, J. Snowden The Early Motive Power of the B&O Railroad, New York: Angus Sinclair Publishing; 1912; reprinted: Glenwood Publishing, 1975, .
 Bell, J. Snowden "The "Camel" engine of Ross Winans,"Journal of the Franklin Institute, Volume 106, Issue 4, October 1878, Pages 246-248, IN3, 249-250.
 Brown, George William,Baltimore and the Nineteenth of April, 1861; A Study of the War,  Johns Hopkins University, 1887 (from Library of Congress)
 Butler, Benjamin F., and Jessie Ames Marshall. Private and Official Correspondence of Gen.Benjamin F. Butler, during the Period of the Civil War .. Norwood, Mass.: The Plimpton press, 1915. (from Google Books)
 Crisafulli, Michael,The Winans Cigar Ships.
 Cottom, Robert I. (ed) "Cigar Boats," Maryland Historical Magazine, Vol 93, No. 4, Winter 1998.
 Lamb, John, A Strange Engine of War: The "Winans" Steam Gun & Maryland in the Civil War, Chesapeake Book Company, 2011
 Lamb, John  A Strange Engine of War: The "Winans" Steam Gun & Maryland in the Civil War, Chesapeake Book Company, 2011, .
 Maryland. General Assembly. House of Delegates. Committee on Federal Relations. Report of the Committee on Federal Relations in Regard to the Calling of a Sovereign Convention. Frederick, Md.: E.S. Riley, printer, 1861.
 Maryland. General Assembly. Protest of the General Assembly Against the Illegal Arrest and Imprisonment by the Federal Government of Citizens of Maryland. Frederick: B.H. Richardson, printer, 1861.
 Mitchell, Charles W. Maryland Voices of the Civil War. Baltimore: Johns Hopkins University Press, 2007.
 Newell (E. T.) Company. "Catalog of auction sale of all the remaining furniture, bric-a-brac, bronzes, statuary,.lot of books by foreign and American authors, etc., within the premises ‘Alexandrofsky’, former home of the Winans, Nov. 5, 1925,.by order of Miss Elsie C. Hutton," Baltimore, 1925. (available at Pratt Library, Baltimore. Call Number: NK570.B4).
 Noskov, Vladimir V. "The End of the Winans' Brothers Railroad Enterprise in Russia," in Whisenhunt, William Benton; Saul, Norman E. New Perspectives on Russian-American Relations, 1st ed, Routledge, 2016, . pp 36–50
 Parker, Theodore, and Ross Winans. Gleanings from Theodore Parker's Works on Speculative Theism. Baltimore, Md: John P. Des Forges,
 Radinsky, Mike "History Captured in Ellicott's Mills - Our quaint little town was the scene of what could have been a turning point in the Civil War... or maybe just a footnote,"  Star Patcher, May 12, 2011, Ellicott City Patch.
 Sagle, L. W. "Ross Winans," paper read before the New York Chapter, R&LHS, Feb. 21, 1947.
 Stakem, Patrick H. and Stakem, Patrick E. From the (Iron) Horses Mouth An updated Roster from Ross Winans' Memorandum of Engines, 2008, PRRB Publishing, .
 Stakem, Patrick H. Ross Winans, an ingenious mechanic of Baltimore. 2016, PRRB Publishing, ASIN B01D8VZ7BY.
 Sullivan, John L. "Remarks on Winans' rail-way carriage," Journal of the Franklin Institute, Volume 11, Issue 1, January 1831, Pages 47–60.
 Sullivan, John L. "On the Baltimore rail-road carriage, invented by Ross Winans, Esq. and the manner of adapting it to streets; also on cheap rail-roads," Journal of the Franklin Institute, Volume 7, Issue 4, April 1829, Pages 231–240. Also ASIN B00085VBEQ.
 Whisenhunt, William Benton; Saul, Norman E. New Perspectives on Russian-American Relations, 1st ed, Routledge, 2016, . (pp 36–50).
 Whistler, George William "Report Upon the Use of Anthracite Coal in Locomotive Engines on the Reading Rail Road, Made to the President of the Philadelphia And Reading Rail Road Company by George W. Whistler, Jr.," Baltimore: Printed by J. D. Toy, Pub. 1849, (available at Pratt Library, Baltimore). 
 Winans, Ross. Collection of Articles and Correspondence in Relation to Baltimore Harbor Nuisance. Baltimore: John P. Des Forges, 1875.
---"The Last of the Camels," Railway Master Mechanic, Dec. 1891, Vol 106, Issue 4, pp 246–248   avail: http://www.catskillarchive.com.
---"School's out for Winans Conversion; Publishing Firm decides to keep Mansion rather than sell it to UB," The Baltimore Sun, May 17, 2004, .
---. Gleanings from various Authors on Sanitary Matters. Selected, Prepared and Published by Ross Winans. Collection of Articles and Correspondence in Relation to Baltimore Harbor Nuisance. Baltimore: John P. Des Forges, 1875.
---. The Jones' Falls Question:Hygiene and Sanitary Matters. Baltimore: J. P. Des Forges, 1872.
---. Minority Report of W., One of the Water Commissioners Appointed ... to Examine the Sources from which a Supply of Pure Water may be obtained for the City of Baltimore. Baltimore:, 1853.
---.Objections to Yielding to Northerners the Control of the Baltimore and Ohio Rail Road, on which Depends the Development of the Farms, Mines, Manufacturers and Trade of the State of Maryland. Baltimore:, 1860.
---. Ventilation and Other Requisites to a Healthy and Comfortable Dwelling:. Baltimore: J. P. Des Forges, 1871.
---. Winans, Ross Pocket Notebook, Collections of the Maryland Historical Society, Baltimore, Maryland, Folder 72, Box 23. The notebook covers the period June 8, 1848 to May 3, 1855.
---.Winans, Ross, Gleanings from Frothingham, Longfellow, and others, selected, compiled and published, John P. Des Forges (1871), ASIN: B00088Y1A4.
---.Winans, Ross "A Communication to the President and Directors of the Baltimore & Ohio Railroad Company, on the subject of Locomotive Engines for the Transportation of Freight on Railroads." Baltimore: printed by John D. Toy, 1856; 
---.Winans, Ross "Address to the President and Directors of the Baltimore & Ohio Railroad Company on the Subject of Locomotive Engines, and the Errors in Relation Thereto, Contained in a Pamphlet Recently Published by Authority of the Company," Baltimore: printed by John D. Toy, 1857.
---.Winans, Ross "Report to P. E. Thomas, President, Baltimore & Ohio Railroad, on the Operation of Peter Cooper’s Engine," August 28, 1830.
---.Winans, Ross "Documents relating to Ross Winans' patent for the eight-wheeled car,"
---.Winans, Ross; Hazlehurst, John;  Latrobe, Benjamin  "Argument Delivered May 1st and 2nd, 1855: In the Case of Ross Winans Vs. the New York and Harlem," Printed by J.D. Toy.  Digitized from 1855 version, avail:
https://www.bookdepository.com/Argument-Delivered-May-1st-2nd-1855-Case-Ross-Winans-vs-New-York-Harlem-Rail-Road-Company-District-Court-Unite-John-Hazlehurst-Boneval-Latrobe/9781425512408.
---.Winans, Ross "Ross Winans vs. the Eastern Railroad Company; Evidence for Complainant October Term, 1853, Counsel R Choate, G T Curtis, C M Keller, C P Curtis," 2012, General Books, LLC,  .
---.Winans, Ross; Hubbell, William Wheeler "Arguments of William W. Hubbell," General Books LLC, 2012, .

References 

 The Museum of Railway Transport (in Russian) http://cmzt.narod.ru/

External links

 
Ross Winans' Letterbook, 1850-51 Archives Center, National Museum of American History, Smithsonian Institution.

1796 births
1877 deaths
American expatriates in Russia
American railroad mechanical engineers
American railroad pioneers
Baltimore and Ohio Railroad people
Burials at Green Mount Cemetery
Mechanics (people)
Members of the Maryland House of Delegates
People from Vernon Township, New Jersey
People of Maryland in the American Civil War
Jules Verne